Monomorium santschii is a species of ant that is native to Tunisia. The most famous species in the genus Monomorium is the highly invasive pharaoh ant, Monomorium pharaonis.

It is a parasitic ant that has no worker caste. The queen enters the colony of a different species and, probably by employing a pheromone, she forces the host workers to kill their queen. She then uses these workers as slaves to bring up her own offspring.

References

  Listed as Vulnerable (VU D2 v2.3)

santschii
Hymenoptera of Africa
Insects described in 1905